The Liberal Democratic Party ( Libaral Pakshaya), formerly known as the Liberal Party is a political party in Sri Lanka which initially began as a think-tank called the Council for Liberal Democracy. The party was founded in 1981 by Dr. Chanaka Amaratunga, a longstanding member of the United National Party, which was at the ruling part of Sri Lanka. 

The CLD broke up with the UNP in 1982 over the 1982 referendum, which postponed parliamentary elections for six years. After four years of attempts to promote liberal thinking in Sri Lanka, in particular with regard to constitutional reforms that would promote devolution along with separation and reduction of powers at the center, Dr Amaratunga and several of his associates eventually relaunched the CLD as the Liberal Party in February 1987. 

Though the party never established itself as an electoral success, the Liberal Party continued to have an impact as a think-tank. It contributed seminally to the manifestoes of presidential candidates Sirimavo Bandaranaike and Gamini Dissanayake in 1988 and 1994 respectively.

In 1996, Dr Amaratunga died in a car accident, which led to a significant reduction in party activity. Amaratunga's successor Rajiva Wijesinha contested in the 2000 parliamentary elections and came 6th in a field of 15, a success that served to advance the image of the party.

On 19 June 2022, the Liberal Party was renamed as the Liberal Democratic Party. The first congress of the LDP was held on 26 July 2022. Kamal Nissanka is the current leader of the party and Amal Randeniya is the current general secretary. The party is a member of Liberal International and the Council of Asian Liberals and Democrats.

See also
Liberalism
Contributions to liberal theory
Liberalism worldwide
List of liberal parties
Liberal democracy

References

External links
 official site
Liberal Lanka Blog

Political parties in Sri Lanka
Liberal parties in Asia
United People's Freedom Alliance
1987 establishments in Sri Lanka
Political parties established in 1987